The Taunton Academy is a school with academy status in Taunton, Somerset, England.
The school was formed by the merger of The St Augustine of Canterbury Church of England/Roman Catholic VA School and Ladymead Community School. Its original sponsors were Somerset County Council and the Diocese of Bath and Wells, however the school transferred to the Richard Huish Trust in 2015 and is now sponsored by Richard Huish College. It was opened on 9 September 2010 by Peter Price, the Bishop of Bath and Wells.
Initially the academy admitted pupils aged 11 to 16 and will be based in the existing schools' buildings. In September 2011, the academy opened a sixth form for 100 students. In 2013, the academy moved to new and refurbished buildings on the former Ladymead site on Cheddon Road, with the former St Augustine site being closed.
This plan was temporarily put on hold following the government's major review of the Building Schools for the Future programme in July 2010,
and was subject to review by the Department for Education.

History
The expression of interest to become an academy was submitted by the sponsors to the Department for Children, Schools and Families in February 2009.
The submission document confirmed that both schools had a set of problems. St Augustine had 274 pupils on roll against its capacity of 610, was in the lowest band for deprivation with 21.2% of pupils receiving free school meals against the local authority average of 7.9%, had 38% of pupils achieving five or more GCSE qualifications including English and Mathematics against the local authority average of 46.7% and national average of 47%, and for three years between 2006 and 2009 had set deficit budgets of between 8% and 14%.
Ladymead had 746 pupils on roll against a capacity of 880, had 11.4% of pupils receiving free school meals, and had 41% of pupils achieving five or more GCSE qualifications including English and Mathematics.

The application was approved by education minister Jim Knight in March 2009. By June 2009, the plans looked to be under threat as parental consultation by governors at Ladymead showed strong opposition to the new academy.
However, the final go-ahead was given in January 2010, when the government agreed to the academy's funding.

References

External links
Official website

Academies in Somerset
Educational institutions established in 2010
2010 establishments in England
Schools in Taunton
Secondary schools in Somerset
Church of England secondary schools in the Diocese of Bath and Wells